Yakusha may refer to
Yakusha-e, Japanese woodblock prints of kabuki actors
Yakusha Kure, a character from the Japanese manga series How Heavy Are the Dumbbells You Lift?
Vasil Yakusha (1958–2020), Belarusian rower